The International Phonetic Alphabet (IPA) possesses a variety of obsolete and nonstandard symbols. Throughout the history of the IPA, characters representing phonetic values have been modified or completely replaced. In addition, the rare voiceless implosive series  has been dropped.

Other characters have been added in for specific phonemes which do not possess a specific symbol in the IPA. (See the sections Vowels and Syllabic consonants of the article Standard Chinese phonology.)

There are also unsupported symbols from local traditions that find their way into publications that otherwise use the standard IPA.

While the IPA does not itself have a set of capital letters (the ones that look like capitals are actually small capitals), many languages have adopted symbols from the IPA as part of their orthographies, and in such cases they have invented capital variants of these. This is especially common in Africa. An example is Kabiyé of northern Togo, which has Ɔ Ɛ Ŋ Ɣ. Other pseudo-IPA capitals supported by Unicode are Ɓ/Ƃ Ƈ Ɗ/Ƌ Ə/Ǝ Ɠ Ħ Ɯ Ɲ Ɵ Ʃ (capital ) Ʈ Ʊ Ʋ Ʒ. (See Case variants of IPA letters.)

Capital letters are also used as cover symbols in phonotactic descriptions: C=Consonant, V=Vowel, etc.

This list does not include commonplace extensions of the IPA, such as doubling a symbol for a greater degree of a feature ( extra-long ,  extra stress,  strongly aspirated , and  extra-rhotic ), nor superscripting for a lesser degree of a feature ( slightly prenasalized ,  slightly affricated , and  epenthetic schwa).

For symbols and values which were discarded by 1932, see History of the International Phonetic Alphabet.

The table below shows examples of expansion in the meaning of IPA symbols in broad transcription.

See also 
History of the IPA
Americanist phonetic notation
Uralic Phonetic Alphabet

Footnotes or references 

International Phonetic Alphabet